The Dakota Valley School District is a public school district in Union County, based in North Sioux City, South Dakota.

Schools
The Dakota Valley School District has one elementary school, one middle school, and one high school.

Elementary school 
Dakota Valley Elementary School

Middle school
Dakota Valley Middle School

High school
Dakota Valley High School

References

External links
Dakota Valley School District

School districts in South Dakota